The 2014 season was St. Patrick's Athletic F.C.'s 85th year in existence and was their 63rd consecutive season in the League of Ireland top division. It was the third year that Liam Buckley is the team's manager (in his current spell), following replacing Pete Mahon in December 2011. The Saints finished the previous season as the 2013 champions. The season was very successful on the field as the Saints began by winning the inaugural President's Cup and the Leinster Senior Cup. The biggest triumph of all however was when top scorer Christy Fagan wrote himself into the club's history books by scoring twice in a 2–0 win over Derry City in the 2014 FAI Cup Final, ending a 53-year hoodoo with the cup for the club. Pats also competed in the UEFA Champions League, the Setanta Cup and the League of Ireland Cup.

Squad

Transfers

Preseason

In

Out

Summer

In

Out

Squad statistics

Appearances, goals and cards
Number in brackets represents (appearances of which were substituted ON).
Last Updated – 3 November 2014

Top scorers
Includes all competitive matches.
Last updated 3 November 2014

Top assists
Includes all competitive matches.
Last updated 3 November 2014

Top Clean Sheets
Includes all competitive matches.
Last updated 3 November 2014

Disciplinary record

Captains

Most frequent starting line-up

Most frequent starting line-up uses the team's most used formation: 4–3–3. The players used are those who have played the most games in each respective position, not necessarily who have played most games out of all the players.

Club

Technical Staff
Manager: Liam Buckley
Assistant manager: Alan Reynolds
Coach: Jason Donohue
Goalkeeping coach: Pat Jennings Jr.
Head Of Player Recruitment / Coach: Dave Campbell
Strength and Conditioning Coach: Ger McDermott
Coaches Assistant / Video Analyst: Graham Buckley
Chartered Physiotherapist: Mick Spillane
Physiotherapist: Fearghal Kerin
Physiotherapist: Christy O'Neill
Club Doctor: Dr Matt Corcoran
Kit Man: Derek Haines
Equipment Manager: Gerry Molloy

Kit

|
|
|
|
|}

The club's Away kit was retained from the 2013 season, with new Home kit released for the season.

Key:
LOI=League of Ireland
FAI=FAI Cup
EAC= EA Sports Cup
CHL=Champions League
SSC=Setanta Sports Cup
LSC=Leinster Senior Cup
PRC=President's Cup
FRN=Friendly

Televised Matches

Channels

Premier Division
The 2014 League of Ireland Premier Division fixtures were announced on 20 December 2013. St Patrick's Athletic were revealed to have Cork City at away on the first day of the season. The Saints' first home fixture would be against UCD on the second day of the season.

Final Table

Results summary

Results by round

Matches

Cups

FAI Cup

Second round

Third round

Third round Replay

Quarter-final

Semi-final

Final

EA Sports Cup

Second round

Champions League

The draw for the second qualifying round of the 2014–15 UEFA Champions League will take place on 23 June 2014, with the first leg to be played on 15/16 July and the second leg on the 22/23 July.

Second qualifying round

Setanta Cup

The draw for the 2014 Setanta Sports Cup was made on 11 December 2013 at the Aviva Stadium in Dublin. The clubs set to compete in the competition were 2013 League of Ireland Champions St Patrick's Athletic, 2013 League of Ireland Runners-up Dundalk, 2013 FAI Cup Winners Sligo Rovers and 2013 League of Ireland Cup winners Shamrock Rivers, all from the Republic of Ireland. Representing Northern Ireland, 2012–13 IFA Premiership winners Cliftonville, 2012–13 IFA Premiership Runners-up Crusaders, 2012–13 Irish Cup Winners Glentoran and as Linfield who were next best placed in the league as Cliftonville also won the 2012–13 Irish League Cup. However Cliftonville and Linfield pulled out of the competition to concentrate on their league and cup ambitions, meaning the two next best placed league teams (5th & 6th) from the 2012–13 IFA Premiership would replace them. These sides were Ballinamallard United and Coleraine. The Saints were drawn away to competition débutantes, Ballinamallard United at Ferney Park, County Fermanagh on 24 February 2014 in the first leg, with the return leg at Richmond Park on 10 March.

Quarter-final

Semi-final

Leinster Senior Cup

Having lost the 2013 Leinster Senior Cup Final to Shamrock Rovers just two days after lifting the 2013 League of Ireland trophy, the Saints were hoping to go one step further in the 2014 competition, although the tournament would be last on their priorities of the seven they would play in over the season. Pats were drawn at home to Dundalk, the side who they pipped to the previous season's league title, on 17 February making it their first competitive game of the season.

Fourth round

Quarter-final

Semi-final

Final

President's Cup
The 2014 season was the first year of the President's Cup. The fixture is between the previous season's league winners and the previous season's cup winners. With St Patrick's Athletic being 2013 League of Ireland Champions, they got home advantage against 2013 FAI Cup winners Sligo Rovers on 2 March 2014.

Final

Friendlies

Records

Overall
{|class="wikitable" style="text-align: center;"
|-
!
!Total
!Home 
!Away
|-
|align=left| Games played          || 51 || 26 || 25
|-
|align=left| Games won             || 30 || 18 || 13
|-
|align=left| Games drawn           || 10 || 3 || 7
|-
|align=left| Games lost            || 10 || 5 || 5
|-
|align=left| Biggest win           || 6–0 vs Drogheda United || 6–0 vs Drogheda United || 4–0 vs Drogheda United
|-
|align=left| Biggest loss          || 5–0 vs Legia Warsaw || 5–0 vs Legia Warsaw || 2–0 vs Sligo Rovers, Limerick
|-
|align=left| Biggest win (League)  || 6–0 vs Drogheda United || 6–0 vs Drogheda United || 4–0 vs Drogheda United
|-
|align=left| Biggest win (Cup)     || 6–1 vs Finn Harps, 5–0 vs Ballinamallard United || 6–1 vs Finn Harps, 5–0 vs Ballinamallard United || 3–0 vs St. Patrick's CY
|-
|align=left| Biggest win (Europe)  || N/A || N/A || N/A
|-
|align=left| Biggest loss (League) || 4–1 vs Dundalk || 4–1 vs Dundalk || 2–0 vs Limerick
|-
|align=left| Biggest loss (Cup)    || 5–1 vs Sligo Rovers || 5–1 vs Sligo Rovers || 2–0 vs Sligo Rovers
|-
|align=left| Biggest loss (Europe) || 5–0 vs Legia Warsaw || 5–0 vs Legia Warsaw || N/A
|-
|align=left| Clean sheets          || 18 || 9 || 9
|-
|align=left| Goals scored          || 101 || 59 || 42
|-
|align=left| Goals conceded        || 60 || 35 || 25
|-
|align=left| Goal difference       || +40 || +23 || +17
|-
|align=left| Consecutive Victories || 6 || 4 || 7
|-
|align=left| Unbeaten run          || 10 || 5 || 7
|-
|align=left| Consecutive Defeats   || 1 || 1 || 1
|-
|align=left| Winless Run           || 4 || 2 || 4
|-
|-
|-
|align=left| Points (League)               || 65/99 (66%) || 38/51 (75%) || 27/48 (56%)
|-
|align=left| Winning rate         || 59% || 70% || 52%
|-
|align=left| Top scorer           || Christy Fagan – 27 || Christy Fagan – 18 || Christy Fagan, Conan Byrne – 9
|-

References

External links
St Patrick's Athletic FC Website
St Patrick's Athletic Supporters Forum
2014 St Patrick's Athletic F.C. season at Soccerway

St Patrick's Athletic
2014

ca:St. Patrick's Athletic Football Club
de:St Patrick's Athletic
es:St Patrick's Athletic Football Club
fr:St. Patrick's Athletic Football Club
ga:St Patrick's Athletic Football Club
gv:St Patrick's Athletic F.C.
hr:St Patrick's Athletic F.C.
it:St Patrick's Athletic Football Club
lt:Saint Patrick's Athletic FC
hu:Saint Patrick’s Athletic FC
nl:St. Patrick's Athletic
no:St Patrick's Athletic FC
pl:St. Patrick’s Athletic F.C.
pt:St. Patrick’s Athletic Football Club
ro:St Patrick's Athletic F.C.
ru:Сент-Патрикс Атлетик
tr:St Patrick's Athletic FC